Mit Leib und Seele was a German TV series which ran from September 1989 to July 1993 on ZDF. The 51 episodes revolved around the life of a pastor Adam Kempfert, played by Günter Strack, as he dealt with the problems of his flock in a town near Frankfurt am Main. Audiences were around 15 million for each episode. The series launched the career of Barbara Auer and was syndicated in Italy.

References

External links
 

Television shows set in Hesse
1989 German television series debuts
1993 German television series endings
German-language television shows
ZDF original programming